Odell Murray is an Antigua and Barbudan international footballer who plays as a defender.

International career
Murray has been capped at full international level by Antigua and Barbuda with his first cap in 2004. He was capped for a second time on 7 September 2014.

References

External links
 

1991 births
Living people
Antigua and Barbuda international footballers
Antigua and Barbuda footballers
Association football defenders